Elena Baravilala (also known as Elena) is a Fijian singer-songwriter, Five singles performed by Baravilala, "Fire", "Rain", "You Got You", "Home" And "Seven" were nominated at the Fiji Performing Rights Association Music Awards. From which she has won Best Composition and Music video for "Fire" in 2014 and Best Composition for "Seven" in 2018.

Collaborations
In early 2014, Elena collaborated with Vanuatu Singer Vanessa Quai for her single titled "Angel Over Me". The song was later released in 2014.

In 2017, Elena and Fiji Born composer DJ Ritendra collaborated and came up with the song "Underdogs".

Later the same year she released her new single "Seven" with a music video, a Collaboration with Fijian Singer Pauliasi, this song won her the award for Best Composition at 2018 Fiji Performing Rights Association Music Awards.

Discography

Studio albums 
 In Retrospect (2015)
 Na I DOLE (2017)
 Give Credit To Where Credit Is Due (2017)

Singles 
 Keep on Walking (2010)
 Viti (2011)
 Fire (2013)
 Rain (2014)
 Angel Over Me ft. Vanessa Quai & Davu (2014)
 Here With You  ft. Davu (2014)
 In Retrospect (2015)
 Unusual (2015)
 Tinaqu (2015)
 Ke Dau Dredre (2015)
 If Only You Knew (2015)
 You Got You (2015)
 You Got You (Hiphop Version) with DJ Ritendra & J.Morrison (2016)
 Never Enough with Denslao ft DJ Ritendra (2016)
 Home with The Gang (2017)
 We Got Everything ft. DJ Ritendra, Soul Jay, Khazin & Ozlam (2017)
 Seven ft. Pauliasi (2017)
 Underdogs with. DJ Ritendra (2017)

Remixes 
 Viti (Pacific Remix) with DJ Ritendra (2016)

Music videos
 Keep on Walking (2010)
 Viti (2011)
 Rain (2014)
 You Got You (2016)
 Home with DJ Ritendra (2017)
 Seven ft. Pauliasi (2017)

Awards and nominations

Fiji Performing Rights Association Music Awards

2019
Seven with Pauliasi won the
International Achievement Award at the FIPRA Music Awards

See also 

 Fiji Performing Rights Association
 You Got You

References

External links 
 Facebook Page

Fijian musicians
Living people
People from Suva
1988 births
Women singer-songwriters
21st-century women singers